James Andrew Cheyne Ryan (born 10 February 1983) is a former New Zealand rugby union player. His position was lock.

Ryan was born in Christchurch, New Zealand, and attended Christ's College where he was a significant player in the school's First XV for three years. He later attended Knox College at the University of Otago where he embarked upon Bachelor of Laws and Bachelor of Commerce degrees.

Career
Ryan played for the Highlanders in Super Rugby and for Otago in the National Provincial Championship.

He made his All Black debut age 22, versus Fiji in 2005. He went on to play 9 further test matches for the national side.

Ryan was also a part of the New Zealand under 21 team in 2004.

In 2005 Ryan was labelled by former All Black coach Laurie Mains as "potentially one of the great All Black locks". He was sidelined in April 2007 with a serious knee injury. Ryan had 3 operations in the space of 12 months and announced the termination of his contract with the Otago Rugby Union in March 2008 and confirmed he was taking an indefinite break from rugby.

References

External links

1983 births
New Zealand international rugby union players
Living people
New Zealand rugby union players
People educated at Christ's College, Christchurch
University of Otago alumni
Rugby union players from Christchurch
Rugby union locks